William Paul (1884–1958) was a British socialist politician.

Born in Glasgow, Paul became an active socialist and joined the Socialist Labour Party (SLP) soon after it was founded. In 1911, he moved to Derby, where he ran a market stall selling hosiery and drapery. Moving his stall from city to city, he was able to link  members across northern England and the Midlands, and surreptitiously distribute radical literature.

Paul fully endorsed the 's opposition to World War I, and he supported Derby anti-war activist Alice Wheeldon. In 1917, he authored The State: its Origin and Functions, in which he developed the Marxist theory of the state. He became co-editor of the 's newspaper, The Socialist, and its national organiser. He stood for the party in the 1918 general election in Ince, taking 13% of the votes cast.

This group joined the Communist Party of Great Britain (CPGB) at its founding conference, where Paul put the case against affiliation to the Labour Party. Although the new party voted to affiliate, the Labour Party refused to accept this.

In 1921, Paul became the editor of the 's publication Communist Review, and he stood for Parliament in Manchester Rusholme at the 1923 and 1924 general elections. His candidacies were supported by the local Labour Party.

Paul then became the editor of the Sunday Worker, published by the National Left-Wing Movement. Removed from his posts during the period of Bolshevisation, he remained active in the local peace and Anglo-Soviet friendship movements.

Bibliography
Compulsory Military Service-Should the working class support it? A debate between G. G. Coulton and W. Paul, 1912.
The State: Its Origin and Function. 1917. Reprinted in 1974 by the Communist Organisation in the British Isles.
Labour and Empire: A Study in Imperialism, 1917.
Scientific Socialism: Its Revolutionary Aims and Methods, 1918.
The Irish Crisis: The British Communist Stand on Self-Determination, 1921. Reprinted in 1976 by the Cork Workers' Club.
Communism and Society, 1922.
The Path to Power: The Communist Party on Trial, (No Date) .
Atomic Energy and Social Progress, 1946.

References
Graham Stevenson, Compendium of Communist Biography

External links
William Paul archive

1884 births
1958 deaths
Communist Party of Great Britain members
Scottish communists
Scottish trade unionists
Socialist Labour Party (UK, 1903) members